Syvorotkino is a rural locality (a village) in Mardengskoye Rural Settlement, Velikoustyugsky District, Vologda Oblast, Russia. The population was 33 as of 2002.

Geography 
Syvorotkino is located 9 km west of Veliky Ustyug (the district's administrative centre) by road. Ishutino is the nearest rural locality.

References 

Rural localities in Velikoustyugsky District